Sri Sathya Sai Institute of Higher Learning is a deemed-to-be-University located in Sri Sathya Sai District, Andhra Pradesh, India. It was founded by Sri Sathya Sai Baba on 22 November 1981. There are four campuses of the university, three for men at Prashanthi Nilayam in Puttaparthi; Whitefield near Bangalore; and Muddenahalli, Karnataka and one for women at Anantapur.

Rankings 

Sri Sathya Sai Institute of Higher Learning was ranked in the 101-150 band among universities in India by the National Institutional Ranking Framework (NIRF) in 2022 and in the 151–200 band overall.

References

External links 

 

Sathya Sai Baba
Deemed universities in India
Puttaparthi
Educational institutions established in 1981
1981 establishments in Andhra Pradesh